is a railway station in the city of Hirosaki, Aomori Prefecture, Japan, operated by the private railway operator, Kōnan Railway Company.

Lines
Chūō-Hirosaki Station is the northern terminal of the Kōnan Railway Ōwani Line, and lies 13.9 kilometers from the southern terminus of the line at Ōwani Station.

Station layout

Chūō-Hirosaki Station has one deadheaded side platform serving a single track. The small station building houses an izakaya-style soba restaurant.

Adjacent stations

History
Chūō-Hirosaki Station was opened on January 26, 1952. From April 1, 1997 it has been a kan'i itaku station, run by a group of retired employees from the Kōnan Railway Company.

Surrounding area
downtown central Hirosaki

See also
 List of railway stations in Japan

External links

Kōnan Railway home page 
Location map 
Photo page 

Railway stations in Aomori Prefecture
Konan Railway
Hirosaki
Railway stations in Japan opened in 1952